Cyrus Hall McCormick Jr. (May 16, 1859 – June 2, 1936) was an American businessman. He was president of the McCormick Harvesting Machine Company from 1884 to 1902.

Life and career
McCormick was the eldest child of inventor Cyrus Hall McCormick Sr. and philanthropist Nancy Fowler. He was born in Washington, D.C. on May 16, 1859. McCormick married Harriet Bradley Hammond on March 5, 1889. They had three children – Cyrus Hall McCormick III was born September 22, 1890; Elizabeth McCormick was born July 12, 1892; and Gordon McCormick was born June 21, 1894.

He was president of the McCormick Harvesting Machine Company from 1884 to 1902. McCormick was later president of the merged International Harvester Company starting in 1902. He was also a member of the Jekyll Island Club (aka The Millionaires Club) on Jekyll Island, Georgia.

McCormick's daughter, Elizabeth, died at the age of twelve; in 1908, her parents established the Elizabeth McCormick Memorial Fund, which supported child health and welfare efforts in Chicago and nationwide for many years. Physician and public health advocate Caroline Hedger worked for the fund from 1920 to 1942.

On June 2, 1936, McCormick died in Chicago and was buried at Graceland Cemetery. His brother Harold Fowler McCormick was the husband of Edith Rockefeller. McCormick's son Cyrus Hall McCormick III wrote a history of his grandfather's life and times, his company, and the successor company.

Family tree

References

Bibliography

External links
 McCormick Family Financial Records at the Newberry Library

1859 births
1936 deaths
McCormick family
American people of Scotch-Irish descent
American people of Scottish descent
19th-century American businesspeople
Philanthropists from Illinois
Burials at Graceland Cemetery (Chicago)